Shahe Area is one of the four areas of Changping District, Beijing, China. It shares border with Nanshao Town to the north, Baishan and Beiqijia Towns to the east, Shigezhuang Subdistrict and Dongxiaokou Town to the south, Xibeiwang and Shangzhuang Towns to the southwest, and Machikou Town to the west. In the year 2020, its population was 294,408.

The area was named after three rivers: Nansha, Beisha, and Dongsha. They flow together to form Wenyu River in the east of the area.

History

Administrative divisions 

In 2021, Shahe Area was formed by 46 subdivisions, with 24 communities and 22 villages:

Gallery

See also 

 List of township-level divisions of Beijing

References 

Changping District
Towns in Beijing
Areas of Beijing